Saint-Bonnet-Avalouze (Limousin: Sent Bonet Avalosa) is a village and a former commune in the Corrèze department in central France. Since 1 January 2019, it is part of the new commune of Laguenne-sur-Avalouze.

Population

See also
Communes of the Corrèze department

References

Former communes of Corrèze